These isotope tables show all of the known isotopes of the chemical elements, arranged with increasing atomic number from left to right and increasing neutron number from top to bottom.

Half lives are indicated by the color of each isotope's cell (see color chart in each section). Colored borders indicate half lives of the most stable nuclear isomer states.

The data for these tables came from Brookhaven National Laboratory which has an interactive Table of Nuclides with data on ~3000 nuclides.

Isotopes for elements 0-14
← Previous | Next →Go to Unitized table (all elements)Go to Periodic table

Isotopes for elements 15-29
← Previous | Next →Go to Unitized table (all elements)Go to Periodic table

Isotopes for elements 30-44
← Previous | Next →Go to Unitized table (all elements)Go to Periodic table

Isotopes for elements 45-59
← Previous | Next →Go to Unitized table (all elements)Go to Periodic table

Isotopes for elements 60-74
← Previous | Next →Go to Unitized table (all elements)Go to Periodic table

Isotopes for elements 75-89
← Previous | Next →Go to Unitized table (all elements)Go to Periodic table

Isotopes for elements 90-104
← Previous | Next →Go to Unitized table (all elements)Go to Periodic table

Isotopes for elements 105-118
← Previous | Next →Go to Unitized table (all elements)Go to Periodic table

External links 
 Interactive Chart of Nuclides (Brookhaven National Laboratory)
 The Lund/LBNL Nuclear Data Search
 An isotope table with clickable information on every isotope and its decay routes is available at chemlab.pc.maricopa.edu
 An example of free Universal Nuclide Chart with decay information for over 3000 nuclides is available at Nucleonica.net.
  The LIVEChart of Nuclides - IAEA 
 Links to other charts of nuclides, including printed posters and journal articles, is available at nds.iaea.org.

Tables of nuclides